Ernst Schnabel (26 September 1913 – 25 January 1986) was a German writer and pioneer of the radio documentary (feature). From 1951 to 1955 he was director of the Nordwestdeutscher Rundfunk (NWDR).

In 1947 and 1950 Schnabel "called on listeners to the North-West German radio station (NWDR) to cooperate in his features. His success points to a potential for further work in this sphere that has scarcely been tapped since then: 35,000 and 80,000 listeners respectively took part, with experiences, notes and references, in Schnabel's broadcasts, which in this way became their own."

His first feature was Der 29. Januar 1947 (1947), issued as audiobook in 1988. The oratorio Das Floß der Medusa (The Raft of the Medusa) by the German composer Hans Werner Henze is based on Schnabel's libretto.

Works
 Anne Frank: A Portrait in Courage. New York 1958.
 Story for Icarus. Projects, incidents, and conclusions from the life of D., engineer.  New York 1961.

Selected filmography
Screenwriter
 In Those Days (1947)

Further reading
 Helmut Kopetzky: Ernst Schnabel - Ein Mann im Wettlauf mit der Zeit. MDR 2003.  
 Wolfram Wessels: Leben gegen den Strom. Ernst Schnabel - der Schriftsteller im Rundfunkalltag. SWF 1987. 
 Wolfram Wessels: "Ernst Schnabel", in: Reinhold Viehoff / Jörg Hucklenbroich (Eds.): Schriftsteller und Rundfunk; UVK, 2002; S.99-122 (German)

References

External links
 
 tumblr dedicated to Ernst Schnabel

1913 births
1986 deaths
20th-century German novelists
German male novelists
Members of the Academy of Arts, Berlin
20th-century German male writers
German oratorio and passion librettists